Record FM (sometimes called Record Radio or 97.7 Record FM) is an Urban Contemporary radio station in Kampala, Uganda. Under the Brazilian free-to-air commercial television network; Record Network was established on September 27, 1953. It is related to the Brazilian-based Universal Church of the Kingdom of God. Record FM Uganda is at 97.7 MHz, formed in 2010 and covering central, western, and southern Uganda plus some of northern Uganda.

Their slogan is "Tusabula Hits All Day" (loosely translated as "We Play Hits All Day"). In 2019, 97.7 Record FM was named the Fastest Rising Youth Radio Station by EJazz Media. Bigeye.ug wrote that internally-conducted research showed that 97.7 Record FM was the most listened to station in the central region, that listeners liked the selection of music and programmes, and liked their online presence especially the audio-visual production on its digital platforms.

97.7 Record FM has shows like UG-Breakfast, Hitlab, Big Evening, Hot 7@7 Countdown, Love at Heart, and The Dance Floor by DJ Shiru.

References

External links 

 

Radio stations in Uganda
Radio broadcasting companies of Uganda
Ugandan music